Ahmad Akbari Javid (10 February 1947 – 17 October 2022) was an Iranian fencer. He competed in the individual and team foil and team sabre events at the 1976 Summer Olympics.

Akbari died on 17 October 2022, at the age of 75.

References

External links
 

1947 births
2022 deaths
Iranian male foil fencers
Olympic fencers of Iran
Fencers at the 1976 Summer Olympics
Asian Games gold medalists for Iran
Asian Games bronze medalists for Iran
Asian Games medalists in fencing
Fencers at the 1974 Asian Games
Medalists at the 1974 Asian Games
Iranian male sabre fencers
21st-century Iranian people
20th-century Iranian people